Chlorotherion is a genus of beetles in the family Cerambycidae, containing the following species:

 Chlorotherion consimilis Zacjiw, 1962
 Chlorotherion punctatus Monné, 1998

References

Trachyderini
Cerambycidae genera